False ringtail possums (Pseudochirops) are members of a genus of marsupial in the family Pseudocheiridae. It contains the following species:
D'Albertis's ringtail possum, Pseudochirops albertisii
Green ringtail possum, Pseudochirops archeri
Plush-coated ringtail possum, Pseudochirops corinnae
Reclusive ringtail possum, Pseudochirops coronatus
Coppery ringtail possum, Pseudochirops cupreus

References

Possums
Marsupial genera
Taxa named by Paul Matschie
Taxonomy articles created by Polbot